The Silver Line is a line on the Pittsburgh Light Rail system that runs between Downtown Pittsburgh through the Overbrook neighborhood to Library. It is the renamed service for the former Blue Line –Library branch.

History 
The line from South Hills Junction to Castle Shannon (now called the Overbrook Line) was first constructed by the Pittsburgh and Castle Shannon Railroad (P&CSRR) between 1872 and 1874. In 1905 Pittsburgh Railways leased the route and between 1909 and 1910 converted it from narrow gauge to dual gauge and installed overhead power for trolleys.  South of Washington Junction the line split into two branches, one going southwest towards Washington, Pennsylvania (a portion of which remains as part of the current Red Line), and the other south towards Finleyville, Pennsylvania, later extended to Monongahela with two further branches to Donora and Charleroi, respectively, the latter would be later extended to Roscoe.

In 1953, the Roscoe and Donora branches were eliminated, and the trunk line to Monongahela was cut back to the current terminus in Library.  This route was designated as 35 Shannon-Library by Pittsburgh Railways Company, and redesignated as 47L Library via Overbrook by successor Port Authority in the 1980s during the Stage I reconstruction of the streetcar system into light rail.  In 1988, a derailment forced the Port Authority to retire all of the PCC cars that had not been rebuilt into the 4000-series, leaving only the twelve 4000 PCC's and four "Super 17's" available to serve the Overbrook, Library, and Drake lines, thus necessitating the use of LRV's on at least one of these lines to maintain service.  Of the three, the Library line was found to be the best suited to accommodate the larger LRV's with only minor modifications, and the route was modified and redesignated in December, 1988 as the "42L Library via Beechview", which, as the name states, originates on the Library branch, but transverses the Beechview corridor between Castle Shannon and South Hills Junction, as the Overbrook corridor could not accommodate the LRV's.

Between 1999 and 2004, Port Authority undertook a complete reconstruction of the deteriorated Overbrook corridor.  During this time, the Lytle stop along the Library branch was rebuilt into a high level platform station, and the terminal of the branch was rebuilt.  South of West Library, the stops at Hicks and Pleasant Street were eliminated, and Simmons was replaced with the current Library Station.

The Overbrook corridor was reopened on June 2, 2004, following major work which included doubling of the track and elimination of 22 traditional street level trolley stops in favor of eight new LRV style stations with platforms.  At this time, the 42L route was reverted to the 47L to serve the rebuilt line.

The Port Authority closed five stations along the Library branch on June 25, 2012: Martin Villa, Mine 3, Lindermer, Center. and Latimer.  Other former Library branch stops that were closed include Latimer, Logan, and Leonard. As part of the Authority's new color-coding route system, the 47L was redesignated as Blue Line - Library.

On March 15, 2020, the Library branch of the Blue Line was renamed the Silver Line.

Route 
The Silver Line starts at Allegheny station on the North Shore, makes an additional stop at North Side, then proceeds under the Allegheny River and continues underground to Gateway Center, Wood Street and Steel Plaza. The line then surfaces at First Avenue. Leaving downtown, it crosses the Monongahela River on the Panhandle Bridge, stopping at Station Square before running through the Mount Washington Transit Tunnel. At South Hills Junction the Silver Line rejoins the Beechview line and the former Brown Line, which ran over Mount Washington through the Allentown neighborhood. The Silver Line continues south through Beltzhoover, Bon Air, Carrick, Brookline, and Overbrook. At Bethel Park a transfer is provided to the Red Line, which reaches the same location via Beechview. Beyond Washington Junction the line splits.  The Silver Line runs south through Willow and ends at Library in South Park.

Station list 
The Pittsburgh Light Rail has three types of stations. They are low platform, high platform, and underground. High platform and underground stations are wheelchair accessible as the train doors are level with the platform. Low platform stations are not wheelchair accessible as they require passengers to climb stairs to board the light rail vehicle.

References

External links 

 Silver Line schedule

Light rail in Pennsylvania
Electric railways in Pennsylvania
Port Authority of Allegheny County
Underground rapid transit in the United States
5 ft 2½ in gauge railways in the United States
Streetcars in Pennsylvania
Passenger rail transportation in Pennsylvania
Transportation in Pittsburgh
650 V DC railway electrification